"Vienna, City of My Dreams" (German:"Wien, du Stadt meiner Träume") is a 1914 song composed by the Austrian Rudolf Sieczyński who also wrote the lyrics. The 1957 film Vienna, City of My Dreams takes its title from the song.

With its lyrics translated into English by Edward Lockton (Edward Teschemacher), it enjoyed popularity in Britain and the United States. Richard Tauber performed the song in the 1935 British operetta film Heart's Desire.

References

Bibliography 

 Tyler, Don.  Hit Songs, 1900-1955: American Popular Music of the Pre-rock Era. McFarland, 2007.

German-language songs
Austrian songs
1914 songs
Songs about Vienna
Songs about cities
Songs with lyrics by Edward Teschemacher